Papilio bianor, the Common peacock or Chinese peacock black swallowtail emerald or Chinese peacock is a species of butterfly in the family Papilionidae, the swallowtails. It is native to Asia.
It is the state butterfly of the Indian state of Uttarakhand.

Description
This species is variable in size. Individuals emerged in the spring reach 4 to 8 centimeters wide, while those emerged in the summer can reach 12 centimeters. The forewings are black with dark veining and green scales. The undersides are brown, turning white distally with dark veining. The hindwings are tailed and have ridged edges containing reddish eyespots. The body is black with green scales.

The male has black hair on the forewings, which the female lacks.

Subspecies
There are many subspecies.

 P. b. okinawensis (Yaeyama islands, Okinawa, Japan)
 P. b. ryukyuensis (Okinawa islands, Japan)
 P. b. amamiensis (Amami islands, Kagoshima, Japan)
 P. b. tokaraensis (Tokara islands, Kagoshima, Japan)
 P. b. hachijonis (Hachijo island, Izu islands, Japan)
 P. b. kotoensis Sonan, 1927 (Taiwan)
 P. b. thrasymedes Fruhstorfer 1909 (Taiwan)
 P. b. polyctor Boisduval, 1836 
 P. b. ganesa Doubleday, 1842 (Sikkim, Assam, N.Vietnam, Yunnan)
 P. b. gladiator Fruhstorfer, 1902

Biology
This species can be found in forests and other wooded areas. It can occur in suburban and urban areas if appropriate host plants are available.

Food plants include species of citrus, prickly ash, cork trees, trifoliate orange, rue, and Japanese skimmia.

Using the species as a model to investigate the iridescent colour evolution, phylogeography, and the evolution of swallowtail butterflies a chromosome scale genome has been sequenced, the final assembly being 421.52 Mb in size, with 15,375 protein-coding genes and 30 chromosomes (29 autosomes and 1 Z sex chromosome). Phylogenetic analysis of this data indicating that P. bianor separated from a common ancestor of swallowtails ∼23.69–36.04 million years ago.

References

Further reading 

 
 
 

bianor
Butterflies of Indochina
Symbols of Uttarakhand
Articles containing video clips
Butterflies described in 1777